Esuperanzio Raffaelli (died 24 March 1668) was a Roman Catholic prelate who served as Bishop of Penne e Atri (1661–1668).

Biography
On 21 November 1661, Esuperanzio Raffaelli was appointed during the papacy of Pope Alexander VII as Bishop of Penne e Atri. On 30 November 1661, he was consecrated bishop by Giulio Cesare Sacchetti, Cardinal-Bishop of Sabina, with Ottaviano Carafa, Titular Archbishop of Patrae, and Emilio Bonaventura Altieri, Bishop of Camerino, serving as co-consecrators. He served as Bishop of Penne e Atri until his death on 24 March 1668.

See also 
Catholic Church in Italy

References

External links and additional sources
 (Chronology of Bishops) 
 (Chronology of Bishops) 

17th-century Italian Roman Catholic bishops
Bishops appointed by Pope Alexander VII
1668 deaths